Nigerian Canadians are Canadian citizens and residents of Nigerian origin and descent. Nigerians began migrating to Canada during the 1967–1970 Nigerian Civil War. Nigerians were not broken out separately in immigration statistics until 1973. 3,919 landed immigrants of Nigerian nationality arrived in Canada from 1973 to 1991.

There is a significant number of Nigerians living in the Greater Toronto Area. In the 2016 census, 51,800 people identified themselves as Nigerians, of whom about half lived in Ontario. There are many more Nigerians in Canada, who identified themselves by their tribe instead of their country, such as 16,210 are Yoruba, 18,315 are Igbo, and 17,275 are from minor tribes. There has also been a steady increase in the number of Nigerians living in the western cities of Canada, such as Calgary, Edmonton, and Winnipeg.

Demographics

Notable people

See also

Black Canadians
Nigerian Australians
British Nigerians
Nigerian Americans
Nigerian people in Italy
Nigerians in the Netherlands
Nigerians in Ireland
Nigerians in Switzerland

References

Sources

Adekola, S (2017). "From Brain Drain To Brain Train – A Transnational Case Analysis Of Nigerian Migrant Health Care Workers" (2017). Theses and Dissertations (Comprehensive). http://scholars.wlu.ca/etd/1987
Ethnic Origin (279), Single and Multiple Ethnic Origin Responses (3), Generation Status (4), Age (12) and Sex (3) for the Population in Private Households of Canada, Provinces and Territories, Census Metropolitan Areas and Census Agglomerations, 2016 Census - 25% Sample Data, Statistics Canada, 2016, retrieved 2020-12-22

External links
 
 

African Canadian
Ethnic groups in Canada
Canada